Criminals is a 1975 Indian Malayalam film,  directed by S. Babu and produced by Salam Karassery. The film stars Adoor Bhasi, Manavalan Joseph, Prema and Sreemoolanagaram Vijayan in the lead roles.

Cast

Adoor Bhasi
Manavalan Joseph
Prema
Sreemoolanagaram Vijayan
Nilambur Balan
Alummoodan
Aroor Sathyan
Bharagavan Pallikkara
J. A. R. Anand
J. M. Kozhikode
K. P. Ummer
Kaduvakulam Antony
Kambanam Murali
Kunchan
Kuthiravattam Pappu
Malappuram Motheenkutty
P. K. Abraham
Paravana Abdulrahman
Rani Chandra
Salam
Sinbad
Surasu
Swapna
Swathi
Ushanandini
Vincent

Soundtrack
The music was composed by M. S. Baburaj and the lyrics were written by Poovachal Khader, Sreemoolanagaram Vijayan and Bichu Thirumala.

References

External links
 

1975 films
1970s Malayalam-language films